The Voice of Finland (season 1) was the first season of the Finnish reality singing competition based on the international The Voice format. The season premiered on Nelonen on December 30, 2011, and concluded on April 20, 2012. 

The coaches were legendary singer Paula Koivuniemi, glam rock singer Michael Monroe, former Lauri Tähkä & Elonkerjuu frontman Lauri Tähkä, and rapper Elastinen. Axl Smith hosted the program, with Kristiina Komulainen serving as the backstage and social networking correspondent. 

The winner of the first season was Mikko Sipola, mentored by Elastinen. The runner-up was Saara Aalto.

Overview
The series consists of three phases: a blind audition, a battle phase, and live performance shows. Four judges/coaches, all noteworthy recording artists, choose teams of contestants through a blind audition process where the coaches cannot see, but only hear the auditioner. Each judge has the length of the auditioner's performance (about one minute) to decide if he or she wants that singer on his or her team; if two or more judges want the same singer (as happens frequently), the singer has the final choice of coach. 

At the end of the blind auditions only Lauri Tähkä had full team of twelve singers. In the following additional auditions broadcast on Radio Aalto, all coaches added one more singer to their teams, leaving Tähkä with one extra.

Each team of contestants is mentored and developed by its respective coach. In the second stage, called the battle phase, coaches have two of their team members battle against each other directly by singing the same song together, with the coach choosing which team member to advance from each of four individual "battles" into the first live round. At this stage the coaches were assisted by songwriter and producer Jukka Immonen (Elastinen), the vocalist of Reckless Love Olli Herman (Tähkä), singer-songwriter and producer Lasse Kurki (Koivuniemi), and producer Riku Mattila (Monroe). 

In the final phase, the remaining contestants (Final 24) compete against each other in live broadcasts. Within the first live round, the surviving six acts from each team again compete head-to-head, with public votes determining one of two acts from each team that will advance to the final eight, while the coach chooses which of the remaining acts comprises the other performer remaining on the team. The television audience and the coaches have equal say 50/50 in deciding who moves on to the semi-final. In the semi-final the results are based on a mix of public vote, Spotify listening of the previous week's performances, and voting of coaches. Each carries equal weight of 100 points for a total of 300 points. With one team member remaining for each coach, the (final 4) contestants compete against each other in the finale with the outcome decided by Spotify vote and public vote, both with equal weight of 100 points for a total of 200 points.

All four finalists released a single and the winner received a record deal with Universal.

Episodes

The Blind Auditions

Episode 1: December 30, 2011

Episode 2: January 6, 2012

Episode 3: January 13, 2012

Episode 4: January 20, 2012

Episode 5: January 27, 2012

Episode 6: February 6, 2012

The Wildcards

The Battle Rounds 

Aired from February 10 to March 2, 2012. 

 – Battle Winner

The Live Rounds

Episode 1: March 9, 2012

Episode 2: March 16, 2012

Episode 3: March 23, 2012

Episode 4: March 30, 2012

Episode 5: April 6, 2012

Semi-Final: April 13, 2012 
Competition performances

Semi-Final results

Finale: April 20, 2012 
The four finalists each performed a cover song and an original song. 

Competition performances

Final results

 – Winner
 – Runner-up
 – Second/Third runner-up

Summaries

Results table

Team Elastinen

Team Lauri

Team Paula

Team Michael

See also
The Voice (TV series)
:fi:The Voice of Finland

References

External links
The Voice of Finland Official website

1
2012 Finnish television seasons
2011 Finnish television seasons
2010s Finnish television series